The 53rd government of Turkey (6 March 1996 – 28 June 1996), known as "ANAYOL" or "Second Mesut Yılmaz government," was a coalition government formed by True Path Party (DYP) and Motherland Party (ANAP). It was the first rotation government to be formed outside of Israel.

Background
In the elections held on 24 December 1995, five parties entered the parliament with no party holding the majority. The coalition talks continued for more than two months, and finally, two parties, Motherland Party (ANAP) and True Path Party (DYP), agreed to form the coalition. Although their total number of seats in the parliament (268 out of 550) was still less than 50%, Democratic Left Party (DSP) promised to support the government during the voting of confidence without participating in the government. According to the agreement, the DYP would receive more seats in the cabinet, and the premiership would be rotated between the parties on a yearly basis: ANAP would hold it in 1996 and 1999, while the DYP would do so in 1997, 1998 and 2000.

The government
In the list below, the serving period of cabinet members who served only a part of the cabinet's lifespan are shown in the column "Notes".

Aftermath 

Both coalition parties had a similar ideology but were rivals of one another. Thus, from the first day, the coalition was faced with difficulties. On 24 May 1996, True Path Party (DYP) decided to withdraw from the government and formed another coalition with the Welfare Party (RP) on 28 June.

References

Motherland Party (Turkey) politicians
Democrat Party (Turkey, current) politicians
Cabinets of Turkey
1996 establishments in Turkey
1996 disestablishments in Turkey
Cabinets established in 1996
Cabinets disestablished in 1996
Coalition governments of Turkey
Rotation governments
Members of the 53rd government of Turkey
Motherland Party (Turkey)